Massa Lombarda is a comune (municipality) in the Province of Ravenna in the Italian region Emilia-Romagna, located about  east of Bologna and about  west of Ravenna.

Notable people
 

Angiolo Torchi (1856-1915), painter

Twin towns
Massa Lombarda is twinned with:

  Poreč, Croatia, since 1981

References

External links
 Official website

Cities and towns in Emilia-Romagna